Lucas Albornoz is a Canadian rugby union player for Northland of the Mitre 10 Cup. He has played for the Canadian national team.

References

1991 births
Canadian rugby union players
Houston SaberCats players
Living people
Sportspeople from Vancouver
Canada international rugby union players
Rugby union locks
Northland rugby union players